Eulima latipes is a species of sea snail, a marine gastropod mollusk in the family Eulimidae. The species is one of a number within the genus Eulima.

Distribution
This marine species is endemic to Australia and occurs off Queensland.

References

  Watson, R.B. 1883. Mollusca of "H.M.S. Challenger" expedition. Part XVII. Fam. Pyramidellidae, Gray. Journal of the Linnean Society of London, Zoology 17: 112-130

External links
 To World Register of Marine Species

latipes
Gastropods described in 1883
Gastropods of Australia